Haltu is a southern neighbourhood of Kolkata, in West Bengal, India. This is mainly a residential area surrounded with Kasba, Jadavpur, Nandi Bagan, Kalikapur, Dhakuria and Selimpur.

Transport
Garfa Main Road and Kalikapur Road intersect here. The area is well connected with Kolkata's Bus network.

Bus

Private Bus
 1 Ramnagar - Mukundapur
 47B Lake Town (Jaya) - Kasba (Dhanmath)
 212 Howrah Station - Palbazar (Jadavpur railway station)
 SD8 Bibirhat - Nandi Bagan

Mini Bus
 S105 B.B.D. Bagh - Gangulypukur
 S108/1 Howrah Station - Haltu P. Majumdar Road
 S108/2 Howrah Station - Safui Para
 S116 Howrah Station - Garia railway station

WBTC Bus
 S4D Parnasree Pally - New Town Bus Stand
 ST6 Tollygunge Karunamoyee - Salt Lake Sector-5
 AC4A Parnasree Pally - New Town Shapoorji Housing Estate
 V9 Tollygunge - New Town Bus Stand
Auto-rickshaws and Taxies are available also.

Train
Ballygunge Junction railway station, Dhakuria railway station and Jadavpur railway station are the nearest railway stations.

Educational Institution
Here is a list of educational institutions situated near Garfa area. 
 Haltu High school for boys
 Haltu High school for girls
 Haltu Kishalaya Sikhsha Sadan
 Academy for Musical Excellence

Markets
Haltu neighbourhood has two well known markets.
 Haltu Bazar
 Ramlal Bazar

See also
Jadavpur
Garfa

References

Neighbourhoods in Kolkata